The 200 quota places for equestrian at the 2024 Summer Olympics were divided between the three disciplines (75 for jumping, 65 for eventing, and 60 for dressage). Teams in each discipline consisted of three horse and rider pairs; any NOC that qualified a team (20 teams for jumping, 16 for eventing, and 15 for dressage) also received three entries in the individual competition for that discipline. NOCs that did not qualify teams could earn one individual place in dressage and jumping and up to two individual places in eventing, for a total of 15 entries in jumping and dressage and 17 for eventing. Teams qualify primarily through specific competitions (World Equestrian Games and continental tournaments), while individuals qualify through rankings. The host nation, France, automatically qualified a team in each discipline.

Timeline
The following is a timeline of the qualification events for the equestrian events at the 2024 Summer Olympics.

Qualification summary

Dressage

Team

Individual

Eventing

Team

Individual

Jumping

Team

Individual

References

Equestrian at the 2024 Summer Olympics
Qualification for the 2024 Summer Olympics